Roger Vincent Gyles  (born 22 August 1938) is a former Australian judge who is currently the Independent National Security Legislation Monitor. In this role he is tasked to monitor and examine the Australian Government’s new counter-terrorism legislation. He has previously been an Acting Judge of the Court of Appeal of the Supreme Court of New South Wales, a judge of the Federal Court of Australia and a Royal Commissioner.

Early life
Gyles was educated at Newington College (1950–1954) and graduated from the University of Sydney with First Class Honours in Law in 1961.

Legal career
After practising as a solicitor, Gyles was admitted to the New South Wales Bar in 1964 and took silk in 1975. He acted as Master in Equity in 1975 and as a Judge of the Supreme Court of New South Wales in 1989. Between 1982 and 1984 he acted as Special Commonwealth Prosecutor into Bottom of the harbour tax avoidance, and between 1990 and 1992 he was Royal Commissioner into the Building Industry in New South Wales. He has been President of both the New South Wales and Australian Bar Associations. Gyles was a Judge of the Federal Court of Australia from 1999 to 2008 and then an Acting Judge of the Court of Appeal of the Supreme Court of New South Wales. He has served as an additional judge of the Supreme Court of the Australian Capital Territory, a Deputy President of the Australian Competition Tribunal, a Presidential Member of the Administrative Appeals Tribunal and an Arbitrator of the Court of Arbitration for Sport. In December 2014 Gyles was named the Independent National Security Legislation Monitor.

Honours
 Officer, Order of Australia (2000) - For service to the legal profession and the judiciary, particularly as a Royal Commissioner and Special Prosecutor, and to the community.

References

1938 births
Living people
Officers of the Order of Australia
Judges of the Federal Court of Australia
Judges of the Supreme Court of the Australian Capital Territory
Judges of the Supreme Court of New South Wales
20th-century Australian judges
21st-century Australian judges
Australian King's Counsel
People educated at Newington College